East River High School is a high school located in east Orange County, Florida, United States. It is located in the Bithlo area. East River High School was built in 2009 as a relief school to reduce overcrowding in nearby high schools Timber Creek High School and University High School. It is part of the Orange County Public Schools and serves grades 9-12.

References

Notable alumni
 ILYMAZZI American Rapper

External links
East River High School website

High schools in Orange County, Florida
Public high schools in Florida
Orange County Public Schools
Educational institutions established in 2009
2009 establishments in Florida